Nykøbing means "new city". It may refer to several towns:

 Nykøbing Falster, on the island of Falster, Denmark
 Nykøbing Mors, on the island of Mors, Denmark
 Nykøbing Sjælland, on the island of Sjælland, Denmark

See also
 Nyköping, a locality and the seat of Nyköping Municipality, Södermanland County, Sweden
 Nyköping Municipality, a municipality in Södermanland County in southeast Sweden